Guido Zingerle (3 September 1902 – 9 August 1962), known as The Monster of Tyrol, was an Italian murderer and possible serial killer who killed at least two women in the 1940s and raped another three. In his murders, Zingerle had specially-equipped caves in the Tyrolean mountains, where he would abduct and then rape his victims. He killed by burying his victims under a pile of stones to let them die in days of agony, which he often observed. After the Second World War, he moved to Innsbruck in Austria.

Murders 
Zingerle's first confirmed victim was the young teacher Gertrud Kutin (sister of Helmut Kutin, Honorary Director of the SOS Children's Villages) from Bolzano, whom he kidnapped in Glaning in May 1946. He raped and then buried her under heavy stones, until she died several days later. Shortly thereafter, he raped a 15-year-old girl from Karneid, whom he also buried with rocks, but she managed to free herself. In 1947, two women escaped as well, after being trapped and raped for several days; Zingerle was imprisoned for a year for these crimes. Three years later, he raped and murdered an English tourist in Iss, on the eastern slope of the Patscherkofel in Austria.

Arrest and detention 

In August 1950, after five weeks of prosection by the police from both North and South Tyrol, Zingerle was placed in an alpine hut near Vals. After trials in Bolzano and Innsbruck, he was sentenced to multiple counts of life imprisonment.

On 9 August 1962 Zingerle died from liver cancer in the Turi prison.

Aftermath 
Guido Zingerle was known as the epitome of evil in the region for decades, with parents often using the educational formula "If you are not good, then Zingerle will get you." against rebellious children.

In 2010, the play "Gemma Zingerle schaugn" was premiered in Absam, by author Gertraud Lener. It's about the last minutes of the murderer in his cell, in which he meets death and is confronted by his deeds. In 2015, the play "Fliegende Hitzen", written by Lorenz Gutmann and Veronika Eberl, was premiered at the Tyrolean folk plays in Telfs. With dark humour included, Zingerle's life story is retold.

In the 40-minute feature film Zingerle, directed by Eric Marcus Weglehner, Roland Silbernagl plays the role.

Literature 
 Heinrich Schwazer: Zingerle: History of a woman murderer. Raetia, Bolzano 2002, .
 Artur Oberhofer: The great criminal cases: The murderer Zingerle - The story of the Monster of Tyrol,

See also 
 List of serial killers by country

References 

1902 births
1962 deaths
Deaths from liver cancer
Kidnappers
People convicted of murder by Austria
People convicted of murder by Italy
People from Kastelbell-Tschars
Prisoners sentenced to life imprisonment by Austria
Prisoners sentenced to life imprisonment by Italy
Suspected serial killers